Ariadnes Colles is a region of colles (hills) in the northeast of Eridania quadrangle of Mars. It is located around 34.5 ° south latitude, and 172.78° east longitude. The feature was named after a classic albedo feature by the IAU in 1982.

References 

Eridania quadrangle
Hills on Mars